Kitzingen is a Landkreis (district) in Bavaria, Germany. It is bounded by (from the north and clockwise) the districts of Schweinfurt, Bamberg, Neustadt (Aisch)-Bad Windsheim and Würzburg.

History
The district in its present form was established in the administrative reform of 1973. The former district of Gerolzhofen was dissolved, and half of its territory was merged with the Kitzingen district (which had been much smaller before). The city of Kitzingen lost its status as a district-free city and was incorporated into the district.

Geography
The river Main runs through the district from south to north.

Coat of arms
The coat of arms displays:
 the bridge from the arms of the town of Kitzingen
 the grapes are symbolising the viticulture
 the shield in the left is from the Bishopric of Würzburg, which once ruled over the region
 the shield in the right is from the arms of the principality of Castell

Towns and municipalities

References

External links

Official website (German)

 
Districts of Bavaria